Machhand is village panchayat situated in Bhind district of the Indian State of Madhya Pradesh.

Villages in Bhind district